Almașu Mare is a commune located in Alba County, Transylvania, Romania.

With a population of 1,289 according to the 2011 census, the commune is composed of seven villages: Almașu Mare, Almașu de Mijloc, Brădet, Cib, Cheile Cibului, Glod and Nădăștia. Its current mayor, as of 2006, is Aron Zaharie. A former mining centre for gold, its income comes now mainly from agricultural and agrotouristical activities.

Almașu Mare's tourist objectives are the Cibu Gorges, the Glod Gorges, a thermal spring and the Achim Emilian ethnographical museum.

References

Communes in Alba County
Localities in Transylvania
Mining communities in Romania